Elton John's 2010 European Tour started in Portugal on 22 May and came to an end on 29 June in the Faroe Islands. During the tour Elton and the band performed in Morocco, Serbia, Bulgaria, the Czech Republic, Belarus and the Faroe Islands for the first time.

Tour dates

Festivals and other miscellaneous performances

References

External links
 
 Information Site with Tour Dates

Elton John concert tours
2010 concert tours